The Tianjinxi (West) Railway Station is a high-speed railway station in Tianjin. It is served by the Beijing–Shanghai railway and Jinbao Intercity Railway and by the Beijing–Shanghai high-speed railway.

Extension Project
In 2008, renovation and expansion works of the station began, in tandem with the construction of the Beijing-Shanghai high speed railway. After the completion of the Beijing-Shanghai High Speed Railway, and in anticipation for services of the Beijing-Tianjin Intercity Railway, Tianjin West's platforms were increased from 13 to 24. These include 9 high-speed platforms with 17 railway lines. The reconstruction of the station building involved the creation of a new main station building with a larger waiting room, a new North-South underground connection square, baggage check-in points, and facilitated access. The new Tianjin West station can be reached by bus, Metro (Tianjin Metro Line 1, 4, 6; Line 4 currently not in service), taxi, or on foot. Tianjin West Railway Station will replace the main Tianjin station to become the largest transportation hub of the city of Tianjin. The station was designed by the internationally renowned architectural firm Gerkan, Marg and Partners and was officially opened in summer 2011. The operation is part of a massive urban renovation project of the north area of Tianjin that will bring the station in the centre of a new residential and commercial development.

Metro connection
The railway station is served by Lines 1 and 6 on the Tianjin Metro. The metro station opened on 12 June 2006. Line 4 is expected to serve the station by 2024.

See also
 Tianjin railway station
 Tianjin South railway station
 Tianjin Metro

References

External links

Railway stations in Tianjin
Railway stations in China opened in 2006
Stations on the Beijing–Shanghai High-Speed Railway
Stations on the Tianjin–Qinhuangdao High-Speed Railway
Stations on the Tianjin–Baoding Intercity Railway
Stations on the Beijing–Shanghai Railway
Railway stations in China opened in 1910